Donald S. Chandler is an entomologist working at the Department of Zoology, University of New Hampshire, Durham, New Hampshire.

Beetle Clinidium chandleri is named after him.

References

External links

 Donald S. Chandler, "Anthicidae", in Ross H. Arnett, Jr. and Michael C. Thomas, American Beetles (CRC Press, 2002), vol. 2
 Publications

American entomologists
Living people
Year of birth missing (living people)